Bromwich Terrace is a high relatively flat ice-capped area of about , in the Cook Mountains of Antarctica. It lies between Festive Plateau and Mount Longhurst on the north, and Starbuck Cirque and Mount Hughes on the south. It was named after David H. Bromwich of the Polar Meteorology Group, Byrd Polar Research Center, Ohio State University, who carried out climatological investigations of Antarctica for over 20 years beginning about 1978.

References
 

Terraces of Antarctica
Landforms of Oates Land